The Hilalian dialects are a continuum of Arabic dialects of the Maghreb, which were introduced during the Hilalian invasions between the 11th and 12th centuries, as well as the migration of Arab Hilalian tribes to the Western Maghreb. These dialects played a great role in the emergence of the Egyptian and Maghrebi dialects.

Etymology 
The term Hilalian dialects refer to the Banu Hilal, a confederation of Arab nomadic tribes who invaded North Africa in the eleventh century.

Along with the pre-existing sedentary pre-Hilalian Arabic dialects, they constitute the larger Maghrebi Arabic family.

Varieties and distribution 
Hilalian dialects are found across North Africa, from the western plains of Morocco and the Mauritanian desert to western Egypt, including Libya, the Algerian Hauts-Plateaux and coast, and Tunisia.

Nevertheless, there are several enclaves of Pre-Hilalian Arabic dialects in this area, including old urban dialect-speaking cities (such as Fez, Rabat, Tlemcen, Constantine, Tunis) and four major sedentary rural dialects speaking areas as well as several Berber speaking areas.

Hilalian Arabic has four major varieties:
 Sulaym dialects: in Libya and southern Tunisia;
 Eastern Hilal dialects: in central Tunisia and eastern Algeria;
 Central Hilal dialects: in central and southern Algeria;
 Maqil dialects: in western Algeria and Morocco.

Hassaniya Arabic, spoken in Mauritania, Western Sahara, southern Morocco and parts of northern Mali, is also classified as Maqil.

See also
 Varieties of Arabic
 Pre-Hilalian Arabic dialects
 Maghrebi Arabic

References

Arabic languages
Maghrebi Arabic